The Power of the Rosary is a book on Catholic themes by Reverend Albert J. M. Shamon.

The book revolves around the topic of Catholic beliefs on the power of prayer via the rosary. It builds on the fifteen rosary promises and extends the discussion to the present day. It discusses that the rosary has been featured prominently in the context of several Marian apparitions such as those in Međugorje and Our Lady of Fatima. It also recounts many anecdotal incidents regarding the rosary, ranging from religious and political prisoners in China to every day Catholics.

See also
 Secret of the Rosary
 Rosary devotions and spirituality
 Catholic beliefs on the power of prayer

Footnotes

References
 Rev. Albert J. M. Shamon, The Power of the Rosary, CMJ Publishers, 2003. 

Catholic spirituality
Rosary
Catholic devotions
Books about Catholicism
2003 non-fiction books